The 2022 IIHF Women's World Championship Division I comprised two international ice hockey tournaments of the 2022 Women's Ice Hockey World Championships organised by the International Ice Hockey Federation (IIHF).

The Group A tournament was played in Angers, France, from 24 to 30 April and the Group B tournament in Katowice, Poland, from 8 to 14 April 2022.

All divisions stayed put after all events last year were cancelled due to the COVID-19 pandemic.

France won Group A and was promoted to the top division, while China got promoted after winning the Group B tournament, while Slovenia was relegated.

Group A tournament

Participants

Match officials
Six referees and six linesmen are selected for the tournament.

Standings

Results
All times are local (UTC+2)

Statistics

Scoring leaders
List shows the top skaters sorted by points, then goals.

GP = Games played; G = Goals; A = Assists; Pts = Points; +/− = Plus/minus; PIM = Penalties in minutes; POS = Position
Source: IIHF.com

Goaltending leaders
Only the top five goaltenders, based on save percentage, who have played at least 40% of their team's minutes, are included in this list.

TOI = time on ice (minutes:seconds); SA = shots against; GA = goals against; GAA = goals against average; Sv% = save percentage; SO = shutouts
Source: IIHF.com

Awards

Group B tournament

Participants

Match officials
Four referees and six linesmen were selected for the tournament.

Standings

Results
All times are local (UTC+2)

Statistics

Scoring leaders
List shows the top skaters sorted by points, then goals.

GP = Games played; G = Goals; A = Assists; Pts = Points; +/− = Plus/minus; PIM = Penalties in minutes; POS = Position
Source: IIHF.com

Goaltending leaders
Only the top five goaltenders, based on save percentage, who have played at least 40% of their team's minutes, are included in this list.

TOI = time on ice (minutes:seconds); SA = shots against; GA = goals against; GAA = goals against average; Sv% = save percentage; SO = shutouts
Source: IIHF.com

Awards

References

External links
Official website of IIHF

2022
Division I
2022 IIHF Women's World Championship Division I
2022 IIHF Women's World Championship Division I
Sports competitions in Katowice
2022 in French sport
2022 in Polish sport
IIHF
IIHF